Jhett Tolentino (born December 28, 1976) is a Filipino entertainment producer based in New York City, who is also known for being the second Philippine-born awardee of the Tony Award. He has won three Tony Awards since his Broadway debut in March 2013 and has received his first Grammy Award in February 2017. He was awarded by Malacañan the Pamana ng Pilipino Award for his non-profit and non-commercial work, and for becoming the first Filipino citizen to win both Tony and the Grammy award.

Education
Tolentino attended Calumpang Elementary School (which was since renamed as Esteban Juntado, Sr. Elementary School) from 1983 to 1989. He entered the Basic Education Unit of University of Iloilo as a high school freshman and took up his secondary education from 1989 to 1993. He continued attending University of Iloilo and obtained his Bachelor of Science in Accountancy degree in March 1997.

He has pursued his high school education by applying to a scholarship program being promoted by the Our Lady of Miraculous Medal Parish. Apparently, the scholarship grant is funded by the Meguko Society, a student organization operating at the Jesuit-run Sophia University in Tokyo, Japan. The Meguko Society caters to educational needs of indigenous children from India and the Philippines. Tolentino was awarded scholarship grants from high school to undergraduate by the organization.

He wanted to pursue a tourism degree but has decided to take a degree in accountancy at the University of Iloilo due to the lack of course offering in the region.

When he moved to the United States, he received his certificate in Nursing Assistance from the American Medical Career Training Center in Jamaica, New York in December 2005.

Career
Right after graduation, Tolentino worked in Iloilo City at Mercantile Credit Resource Corporation as a general bookkeeper, and was promoted as an accountant after three months, while serving as the company's corporate secretary. He worked at Mercantile Credit Resource Corporation from 1997 to 2002. He moonlighted in multinational Hong Kong-based companies from 1999 to 2001: as internal auditor for JP Capital Partners Ltd., and as sales and marketing executive for Inside Fashion.

In 2002, he moved to the San Francisco Bay Area for a sales and marketing job at The Good Guys, while moonlighting as a waiter for Continental Caterers and as a babysitter. Soon, he decided to move to the New York tri-state area for a mortgage and finance job in 2004, where he has learned much about the theatre industry. He has sidelined as a nursing assistant in 2006, and when the market crashed as part of the 2008 recession, he worked in the healthcare profession fulltime.

While in New York, working in finance and healthcare, he started writing reviews of theatre shows in his blog.

In February 2016, Tolentino was given recognition by the government of the Philippines through the National Commission for Culture and the Arts-Ani ng Dangal for giving international recognition to the Philippines; and was among The Outstanding Young Men and Women of the Philippines who were awarded the same year by President Rodrigo Duterte at Malacañang Palace in December of the same year. In 2019 Tolentino won Best Short Documentary at the NVIFF Awards in Amsterdam. In 2021, Blogtalk with MJ Racadio named him one of the "75 Most Influential Filipino-Americans".

Personal life
According to his self-produced biographical documentary Life Is What You Make It, Tolentino is the youngest child of Gloria Dizon, a native of Prieto Diaz, Sorsogon and Arthur Tolentino, a native of Iloilo whose roots come from Bataan. Tolentino grew up in a severely impoverished area of Barangay Calumpang, Molo, Iloilo City, which was a few meters across the shore of the Iloilo Strait.

Affiliations

Music credits

Theatre credits

Filmography

Notable awards and nominations

Special citations

References

External links
 
 The Color Purple Cast Recording wins 2017 Grammy Award 
 Jhett Tolentino wins first Grammy 
 Internet Broadway Database: Jhett Tolentino 
 Lucile Lortel Archives: Jhett Tolentino 
 Broadway World: Jhett Tolentino 
 Life Is What You Make it 
 Making Broadway Accessible to Pinoys 
 Former OFW in HK, successful in Broadway 

1977 births
Living people
Filipino theatre people
Grammy Award winners
People from Iloilo City
Businesspeople from New York City
Filipino expatriates in the United States